The men's eight rowing event at the 2011 Pan American Games will be held from October 15–17 at the Canoe & Rowing Course in Ciudad Guzman. The defending Pan American Games champion is Troy Kepper, Chris Callaghan, Gabe Winkler, Dan Beery, Cameron Winklevoss, Sebastian Bea, Patrick O'Dunne, Tyler Winklevoss, Ned Delguercio of the United States.

Schedule
All times are Central Standard Time (UTC-6).

Results

Heat 1

Final A

References

Rowing at the 2011 Pan American Games